Fra Armando Pierucci (born 3 September 1935 in Moie, Italy) is an Italian Franciscan musician who lives in Jerusalem. He graduated from the Pontifical Institute of Sacred Music in Rome, from the Music Conservatories of Naples, and from the Rossini Music Conservatory in Pesaro. Amongst his composition professors he proudly mentions Maestro Vincenzo Donato (who studied with Ottorino Respighi) and Maestro Argenzio Jorio.

He was an Organ professor at the Rossini Music Conservatory of Pesaro. Today many of his past students teach music in various Italian Music Conservatories. He has conducted choirs and given organ recitals in Italy, Greece, Cyprus, and the Holy Land. Since 1988, he has been the organist at Church of the Holy Sepulchre in Jerusalem.  Until 1999, he was Chief Editor of the Italian magazine La Terra Santa ("Holy Land"), quarterly published by the Franciscan Custody of the Holy Land. Presently, he is professor of sacred music at the Studium Theologicum Hierosolymitanum and President of the Magnificat Musical Institute.

Fra Armando Pierucci has composed music for organ, choir, recorder, accordion, brass, and piano, including: 
4 Cori su testo di Salvatore Quasimodo (Ediz. Berben),
Callido verde (Ediz. Berben),
Quaderno d’Organo: 14 composizioni per organo (Ediz. Armelin Musica Padova),
Missa de Angelis Pacis,
Missa Regina Pacis,
Missa Magnificabant Omnes,
Missa Regina Palestinae,
Sonata for Organ and Choir,
The Hymnal,
Zahr Er-Rahm (fifteen songs for voice and piano).

Armando Pierucci's first cantata, over poems by Regina Derieva, Via Crucis was described as "a major find" and "a remarkable work" by critics. In 2001, Fra Armando Pierucci created another cantata over Derieva's poems entitled De Profundis.

References
 Via Crucis, MusicWeb-International, Dec 1999 
 Via Crucis, the Divine Art official website 
 De Profundis, the Divine Art official website

External links
Italian
Italian
Italian
Italian
Premio Vallesina

Italian classical composers
Italian male classical composers
20th-century classical composers
People from the Province of Ancona
Living people
1935 births
20th-century Italian composers
20th-century Italian male musicians